Eduardo Guerrero Cartagena (born February 23, 1971 in Santander, Colombia) is a retired male road racing cyclist from Colombia. He was nicknamed "El Guerrero del Camino" during his career.

Career

1994
1st in Stage 1 Vuelta a Colombia, Bucaramanga (COL)
1999
10th in General Classification Vuelta a Venezuela (VEN)
2000
5th in General Classification Vuelta a Venezuela (VEN)

References
 

1971 births
Living people
Colombian male cyclists
Vuelta a Colombia stage winners
Sportspeople from Santander Department